José Isidro Rico Rangel (born May 15, 1961) is a former marathon runner from Mexico, whose personal best in the classic distance was 2:09:14 (1994). He represented his native country at the 1992 Summer Olympics, finishing in 29th place in the Men's Marathon.

Achievements

References
 sports-reference
 World Athletics

1961 births
Living people
Mexican male long-distance runners
Olympic athletes of Mexico
Athletes (track and field) at the 1992 Summer Olympics
World Athletics Championships athletes for Mexico
20th-century Mexican people